Khergam is a small Town and a Gram Panchayat in Navsari district in the state of Gujarat, India. Khergam is taluka headquarter of newly created Khergam taluka in Navsari district. Khergam is a major junction to reach Navsari, Valsad, Surat, Chikhli, Dharampur, Jujva, Vansada, Limzar, Rumala, Rankuva, Fadvel.
It is near to the Arabian Sea.
khergam is known for his brotherhood 
every cast live together.
Famous Bhagwat and Ram Kathakar Shri Prafulbhai Shukla is from khergam.
many other kathakar are also lives in khergam. almost every state’s peoples are lives in khergam.
khergam is known for Nayan’s Vadapav , Jalaram Khaman , shriji’s Fafda Jalebi.
there are 3 major medical stores in khergam, 1. Shriji medical and general store in main bazar as well as Jalaram medical and general store at dasera tekri.
2 major Hospitals Are in the town ,
Chintuba multiple specialists hospital which is running by Dr Nirav bhai patel

References

Cities and towns in Navsari district